Live Throughout the Years is a 4-CD set of live material by British hard rock band UFO issued in 2007.

Track listing

CD1 - LIVE AT THE ROUNDHOUSE, LONDON 1976

Can You Roll Her
Doctor Doctor
Oh My
Out On The Street
Highway Lady 
I’m A Loser
Let It Roll
This Kids
Shoot Shoot
Rock Bottom
C’mon Everybody
Boogie For George
All Or Nothing

CD2 - HAMMERSMITH ODEON, LONDON 1982

We Belong To The Night 
Let It Rain
Long Gone
Wild, Willing, Innocent
Only You Can Rock Me
No Place To Run
Love To Love
Doing It All For You
Makin’ Moves
Too Hot To Handle
Mystery Train

CD3 - VIENNA, AUSTRIA 1998

Natural Thing
Mother Mary
A Self Made Man
Electric Phase 
This Kids
Out In The Street 
One More For The Rodeo 
Venus
Pushed To The Limit

CD4 - VIENNA, AUSTRIA 1998

Love To Love 
Too Hot To Handle
Only You Can Rock Me
Lights Out 
Doctor Doctor
Rock Bottom
Shoot Shoot

2007 live albums
2007 compilation albums
UFO (band) live albums
UFO (band) compilation albums